Centronia brachycera is a species of plant in the family Melastomataceae. It is endemic to Colombia.

References

brachycera
Vulnerable plants
Endemic flora of Colombia
Taxonomy articles created by Polbot
Taxa named by Charles Victor Naudin